Rudy Mbemba (born August 29, 1987 in Spånga, Sweden) is a Swedish professional basketball player. He is 1.83 m (6 ft) tall and 88 kg (195 pounds) in weight. He plays at the point guard position. He currently plays for Umeå BSKT  Umeå.

Professional career
In his pro career he has played with KFUM Söder, 08 Stockholm Human Rights and the Solna Vikings of the Swedish Basketball League, UB La Palma of the Spanish Second League, the Frankfurt Skyliners of the German Basketball League, Vanoli Gruppo Triboldi Soresina of the Italian Second League, and AEL 1964 GS of the HEBA A1 League.

Doping ban
In June 2014 Mbemba was handed a two-year doping sanction after several whereabouts failures. The ban ended 1 June 2016.

Notes

External links
FIBAEurope.com Player Profile
Draftexpress.com Player Profile
NBADraft.net Player Profile
Gruppotriboldibasket.it Player Profile

1987 births
Living people
A.E.L. 1964 B.C. players
Doping cases in basketball
Swedish men's basketball players
Swedish sportspeople in doping cases
Swedish expatriate basketball people in Germany
Swedish expatriate basketball people in Greece
Swedish expatriate basketball people in Italy
Swedish expatriate basketball people in Spain
Greek Basket League players
Vanoli Cremona players
08 Stockholm Human Rights players
Solna Vikings players
LF Basket Norrbotten players
UB La Palma players
Swedish people of Democratic Republic of the Congo descent
Swedish sportspeople of African descent
Point guards